Volodymyr Korolkov (born 31 January 1986) is a professional Ukrainian football forward.

Korolkov is a product of couple of the Odesa city football academies including Chornomorets and Ukrposhta as well as FC Shakhtar Donetsk. He became noticeable during the 2014-15 Ukrainian First League season when he scored 8 goals playing for Hirnyk-Sport.

References

External links
 
 

1986 births
Living people
Ukrainian footballers
FC Shakhtar-2 Donetsk players
FC Shakhtar-3 Donetsk players
FC Ivan Odesa players
SC Olkom Melitopol players
FC Knyazha Shchaslyve players
FC Knyazha-2 Shchaslyve players
FC Feniks-Illichovets Kalinine players
FC Real Pharma Odesa players
FC Zhemchuzhyna Yalta players
FC Hirnyk-Sport Horishni Plavni players
Ukraine youth international footballers
Association football forwards
Ukrainian First League players
Sportspeople from Odesa Oblast